The Cueva del Castillo, or Cave of the Castle, is an archaeological site within the complex of the Caves of Monte Castillo, in Puente Viesgo, Cantabria, Spain. 

The archaeological stratigraphy has been divided into around 19 layers, depending on the source they slightly deviate from each other, however the overall sequence is consistent, beginning in the Proto-Aurignacian,  and ending in the Bronze Age.

The El Castillo cave contains the oldest known cave painting: a large red stippled disk in the Panel de las Manos 
was dated to more than 40,000 years old using uranium-thorium dating in a 2012 study.
This is consistent with the tradition of cave painting originating in the Proto-Aurignacian, with the first arrival of anatomically modern humans in Europe. A 2013 study of finger length ratios in Upper Paleolithic hand stencils found in France and Spain determined that the majority were of female hands, overturning the previous widely held belief that this art form was primarily a male activity.

Cueva del Castillo was discovered in 1903 by Hermilio Alcalde del Río, a Spanish archaeologist, who was one of the pioneers in the study of the earliest cave paintings of Cantabria.  The entrance to the cave was smaller in the past and has been enlarged as a result of archaeological excavations.
Alcalde del Río found an extensive sequence of images executed in charcoal and red ochre on the walls and ceilings of multiple caverns.
The paintings and numerous markings and graffiti span from the Lower Paleolithic to the Bronze Age, and even into the Middle Ages.  
There are over 150 depictions already catalogued, including those that emphasize the engravings of a few deer, complete with shadowing.

See also 
 Art of the Upper Paleolithic
 List of Stone Age art
 Cave of La Pasiega

References

External links

 Caves of Cantabria - Spanish Government Council of Culture, Tourism and Sport
 Video: Paleolithic Cave Arts in Northern Spain: El Castillo Cave

C
Show caves in Spain
Caves containing pictograms in Spain
Lower Paleolithic
Bronze Age Spain